Arnob & Friends Live is an album by Arnob, released in 2009.

History 
Drishtipat (a non-profit human rights organisation by non-resident Bangladeshis) worked with Arnob and his fellow artists to hold charity concerts titled 'The Unheard Voices World Tour'. Bengal Music Company Ltd released an album titled Arnob & Friends Live with songs played by the band during their concert tour. The album was sponsored by HSBC.

Track List 
 01. Amay Dhore Rakho
 02. Lalpahari
 03. Amay Bhashailire
 04. Hok Kolorob
 05. Chai
 06. Ore Neel Doria
 07. Tomar Jonno
 08. Bhalobasha Tarpor 
 09. Piya Ki Nazarya
 10. Hariye Giyechi
 11. Majhe Majhe
 12. Nao Chariya De

References 

2009 albums